Tribal Canoe Journeys is a celebrated event for the Indigenous peoples of the Pacific Northwest Coast. Founded in 1989, this event has been held annually to bring together members of Indigenous nations from the coasts of Alaska, British Columbia, Oregon and Washington. Members of some nations have used this event to revive traditional techniques of timber harvesting, making large, ocean-going canoes, and teaching canoe skills to new generations. Because of the Covid-19 pandemic, the Canoe Journeys for 2020 and 2021 were postponed.

Many families and teams travel in decorated canoes for this event and don traditional regalia for celebrations. Some canoes are made of the traditional sacred cedar; others are made using more modern techniques and materials. Travelers often visit Native nations en route to the final host destination, which changes each year.

History
"These majestic vessels, crafted from a single log often hundreds of years old, all but disappeared early in this century. It is hard to explain why so little has been written about them, as they are probably the single most important aspect of Northwest Coast culture.... the canoe was as important as the automobile is now to North America."

The Canoe Journey is a revival of the traditional method of transportation and is a significant cultural experience for all participants. The Canoe Journey as an event was organized in 1989. The  "Paddle to Seattle" took place as part of the 100th anniversary of Washington Statehood. That year, the state and indigenous governments signed the Centennial Accord, recognizing indigenous sovereignty. Fifteen Native nations participated in the Paddle to Seattle.

The event has grown in the years since. Each year, a different Native Nation hosts the event, providing food and lodging to the canoe pullers, support crews and other visitors from Alaska, British Columbia, Washington, and Oregon. Depending on the distance a family or team is traveling, the trip by canoe can take up to a month. On arrival at the destination, visiting canoe families ask formal permission of the hosts to land, sometimes speaking in their Native languages. A potlatch is celebrated, a sharing of songs, dances and gifts that lasts for days. The Canoe Journey is family-friendly, and drug- and alcohol-free.

In 2009, the Suquamish Tribe hosted the 20th-anniversary Canoe Journey in their new House of Awakened Culture. They had more than 6,000 guests, some of whom had traveled by 84 canoes.

The 2011 Tribal Journeys event was hosted by the Swinomish Tribe.

Background
Most tribes in North America relied on waterways for transportation, in order to travel for trade,  hunting to provide food for their families, and seasonal shifts in living places. 

Three main types of canoes were built during thousands of years: dugout, bark, and plank canoes. Methods of design and construction varied by different regions. The sizes of the boats varied according to purpose. Sizes varied from one person per boat to up to six people. A typical birch bark canoe measured about 21 feet long (7 metres) and 3 feet wide (1 metre) and could carry 4 - 6 men and about 200 pounds of cargo (91 kilograms).

Native American canoes differ greatly compared to the rest. These canoes are the most traditional used in North America, Central America, and the Caribbean. Through all the different designs of their boats, tribes would be able to recognise each other by the profiles of the boats. 

Native American Bull Boats were ideally steered by women, who would export goods riding down river. These "boats" were made in a round basket-like shape, covered with buffalo fur on the outside of the basket. They could carry much weight (up to a half a ton) while in water.

In the 21st century, some tribes continue to use canoes, especially for their revival of traditional hunting of whales and salmon fishing. Although they use modern canoes rather than the ones established back then, they can still be seen in festivals and they are often used as display.

Effects of Covid 19 pandemic from 2020
Chief Mike Wyse, of the Snuneymuxw First Nation in British Columbia, announced that Tribal Journeys 2020 was postponed due to the COVID-19 pandemic. His nation was supposed to host that year's event. It was the first time since 1993 that the event was not held. 

Because of continued risks from the pervasive pandemic, on October 30, 2020, the Executive Council of the Tla'amin Nation, the designated destination for the next event, announced that Tribal Journeys 2021 would be postponed. For the second year in a row, tribal communities from the Pacific Northwest would not gather. Their spokesman Hegus John Hackett announced the postponement and promised the Tla'amin Nation would host a future event.

List of journeys by year

 1989: Paddle to Seattle, WA
 1993: Paddle to Bella Bella, BC Qatuwas
 1994: Youth Paddle (Olympia, WA, with the 2nd Cedar Tree Conference
 1995: Full Circle Youth Paddle, in Puget Sound, Washington
 1996: Full Circle Youth Paddle, in Puget Sound, Washington]]
 1997: Paddle to LaPush, WA
 1998: Paddle to Puyallup, WA
 1999: Paddle to Ahousaht, BC
 2000: Paddle to Songees, BC
 2000: Paddle to Pendleton, OR
 2001: Paddle to Squamish, BC
 2002: Paddle to Quinault at Taholah, WA
 2003: Paddle to Tulalip, WA
 2004: Paddle to Chemainus, BC
 2005: Paddle to Elwha at Port Angeles, WA
 2006: Paddle to Muckleshoot at Auburn, WA
 2007: Paddle to Lummi, WA
 2008: Paddle to Cowichan at Cowichan Bay, BC
 2009: Paddle to Suquamish, WA
 2010: Paddle to Makah,  Neah Bay, WA
 2011: Paddle to Swinomish at La Conner, WA
 2012: Paddle to Squaxin Island at Kamilche, WA
 2013: Paddle to Quinault at Taholah, WA
 2014: Paddle to Bella Bella, Qatuwas Festival, at Bella Bella, BC on Campbell Island, BC — 2014
 2015: Various locations in the Salish Sea, BC and WA
 2016: Paddle to Nisqually Tribe at Olympia, WA
 2017: Paddle to We Wai Kai, Wei Wai Kum Nations at Campbell River, BC
 2018: Paddle to Puyallup Tribe at Puyallup, WA
 2019: Paddle to Lummi Nation at Lummi, WA

 2020: Paddle to Snuneymuxw First Nation at Nanaimo, BC. Cancelled due to COVID-19
 2021: Paddle to Tla'amin Nation at Powell River, BC. Cancelled due to COVID-19

Future Journeys:
 2022: Paddle to Muckleshoot
 2023: Paddle to Warm Springs, Oregon
 2024: Paddle to Suquamish Tribe
 2025: Paddle to Lower Elwha

References

External links
 Tribal Journeys Blog
 2006 Paddle to Muckleshoot
 2010 Paddle to Makah 
 2011 Paddle to Swinomish
 2012 Paddle to Squaxin
 2013 Paddle to Quinault
 2014 Paddle to Bella Bella
 2016 Paddle to Nisqually
 2019 Paddle to Lummi
 Native Indian Canoes for kids ***
 30 years after the Paddle to Seattle, Tribal Canoe Journeys represent healing and revival
 Canoe Journey Parallels Tribal Efforts to Return Salmon to Upper Columbia
 Teamwork is a constant during annual Canoe Journey
 2020 Canoe Journey to Nanaimo canceled
 Tribal Journeys 2020, Paddle to Snuneymuxw Postponed
 Native American Boats: Bull-Boats, Rafts, and American Indian Canoes

Culture of the Pacific Northwest
Voyaging canoes
Indigenous peoples of the Pacific Northwest Coast
Water transportation in Alaska
Water transportation in Washington (state)
Water transport in British Columbia
Canoeing in the United States
Canoeing in Canada